MMG may refer to:

Maybach Music Group, record label founded by rapper Rick Ross
Mechanomyogram or mechanomyography, (measuring the) mechanical signal observable from the surface of a muscle when the muscle is contracted
Medium machine gun, a category of firearm
Mello Music Group, a hip hop record label in Arizona
Mick McGinley, Gaelic footballer whose son Paul is the professional golfer
MMG Limited, a Chinese-Australian mining company
Mosley Music Group, a record label created by Timbaland
The Motor City Machine Guns, a professional wrestling tag team
Mobile Marketing Group, a telecommunications company specialising in SMS Messaging for Businesses.
Mount Magnet Airport, IATA airport code "MMG"

See also
Motor Machine Gun Service (MMGS), a British Army unit in the First World War that used motorcycle/sidecar combinations equipped with machine guns